Andriy Volodymyrovych Bubentsov (born 2 March 1998) is a Ukrainian professional footballer who plays as a goalkeeper.

References

External links
 

1998 births
Living people
Ukrainian footballers
Ukrainian expatriate footballers
Association football goalkeepers
PFC Sumy players
FC VPK-Ahro Shevchenkivka players
MFC Mykolaiv players
FC Metalist Kharkiv players
FC Polissya Zhytomyr players
Ukrainian First League players
Ukrainian Second League players
III liga players
Expatriate footballers in Poland
Ukrainian expatriate sportspeople in Poland
Sportspeople from Dnipropetrovsk Oblast